Rahmatabad (also Romanized as Raḩmatābād) is a village in Aqda Rural District, Aqda District, Ardakan County, Yazd Province, Iran. At the 2006 census, its population was 26, in 6 families.

References 

Populated places in Ardakan County